The  longfin fairy wrasse (Cirrhilabrus rubriventralis), also known as the social wrasse, is a species of wrasse from the western Indian Ocean from the Red Sea to South Africa, though questionable claims have been made for its occurrence out to the western Pacific. It can be found in the aquarium trade.

There is another species referred to as the social wrasse, Halichoeres socialis, found only in the Pelican Keys in Belize. It is critically endangered.

References

Longfin fairy wrasse
Taxa named by Victor G. Springer
Taxa named by John Ernest Randall
Fish described in 1974